The Monte Fenera Nature Park is a nature reserve of 725.98 hectares on the hills of the Valsesia around the Monte Fenera at an altitude of 899 m.

In the karst caves remains of Neanderthal, Mousterian (Paleolithic) and cave bear were found.

See also 
 CoEur - In the heart of European paths

References

External links

Official website
News about the park

Parks in Piedmont
Tourist attractions in Piedmont
Monte Fenera